The 2016 Ladies Championship Gstaad was a women's tennis tournament played on outdoor clay courts. It was the 24th edition of the Ladies Championship Gstaad (but the first since 1994), and part of the International category of the 2016 WTA Tour. It took place at Roy Emerson Arena in Gstaad, Switzerland, from 11 July through 17 July 2016.

Points and prize money

Point distribution

Prize money

Singles main draw entrants

Seeds

 1 Rankings are as of 27 June 2016.

Other entrants
The following players received wildcards into the main draw:
 Jelena Janković
 Rebeka Masarova 
 Patty Schnyder 

The following players received entry from the qualifying draw:
 Claire Feuerstein 
 Barbara Haas 
 Ons Jabeur 
 Mandy Minella
 Amra Sadiković 
 Sara Sorribes Tormo

Withdrawals
Before the tournament
 Lourdes Domínguez Lino → replaced by  Marina Erakovic
 Daria Gavrilova → replaced by  Jana Čepelová
 Christina McHale → replaced by  Lucie Hradecká
 Carla Suárez Navarro → replaced by  Irina Khromacheva

Doubles main draw entrants

Seeds

1 Rankings are as of 27 June 2016.

Withdrawals
During the tournament
  Johanna Larsson (Left Calf Injury)

Champions

Singles

  Viktorija Golubic defeated  Kiki Bertens, 4–6, 6–3, 6–4

Doubles

  Lara Arruabarrena /  Xenia Knoll defeated  Annika Beck /  Evgeniya Rodina, 6–1, 3–6, [10–8]

References

External links
 

Ladies Championship Gstaad
Ladies Championship Gstaad
WTA Swiss Open
ladies
2016 in Swiss women's sport